Pang Gwang-chol (born 27 September 1970) is a North Korean former footballer. He represented North Korea on at least thirty-six occasions between 1989 and 1993, scoring once.

Career statistics

International

International goals
Scores and results list North Korea's goal tally first, score column indicates score after each North Korea goal.

References

1970 births
Living people
North Korean footballers
North Korea international footballers
Association football midfielders
Footballers at the 1990 Asian Games
1992 AFC Asian Cup players
Asian Games competitors for North Korea